Richard Ewen was an English priest in the second half of the 15th century.

Ewen was Archdeacon of Leicester from 1454 to 1458; and Archdeacon of Lincoln from 1458 to 1463.

Notes

See also
 Diocese of Lincoln
 Diocese of Peterborough
 Diocese of Leicester
 Archdeacon of Leicester

Archdeacons of Leicester
15th-century English people
Archdeacons of Lincoln